Iomar do Nascimento (born 8 April 1966), known as Mazinho, is a Brazilian football manager and former player. Mazinho played primarily as a defensive midfielder and a full-back in his professional playing career. As a manager, he had a short spell at Greek club Aris in 2009.

A former central midfielder, Mazinho played 35 internationals for Brazil national team, winning the 1989 Copa América, 1994 FIFA World Cup and the silver medal at the 1988 Olympics. He was also named in the squads for the 1990 World Cup and 1991 Copa América.

Club career
Mazinho played with Vasco da Gama, Palmeiras and Vitória in his homeland, with Lecce and Fiorentina in Italy, and with Valencia, Celta de Vigo and Elche in Spain. Starting his career as left back, he moved to the midfield in the early 1990s.

Mazinho was a three-time winner of the Campeonato Brasileiro (Brazilian championship) with Vasco da Gama and Palmeiras. He received the Brazilian Silver Ball award in 1987 and 1988.

International career
Mazinho earned 35 caps with the Brazil national team, the first coming in May 1989 in a friendly against Peru and the last during the 1994 FIFA World Cup. At the 1994 World Cup, a tournament Brazil went on to win, he was the third member of the "three men and baby" celebration with Bebeto and Romário in the quarter-final win against the Netherlands. Mazinho was also a Copa América winner in 1989, at which point he was playing as a full-back.

Another player nicknamed "Mazinho" –  Waldemar Aureliano de Oliveira Filho – played for Brazil at the 1991 Copa América, and was known as "Mazinho Oliveira" or "Mazinho II" to avoid confusion between the two men.

Managing career
In January 2009, Mazinho was appointed as a new head coach of Greek side Aris, replacing Spanish Quique Hernández. Mazinho, however, was later replaced with former Valencia coach Héctor Cúper in November 2009.

Statistics

Personal life
Mazinho is the father of current players, Thiago of Liverpool and Rafinha of Al-Arabi. His wife, Valéria, was a former volleyball player.

Honours

Club
Vasco da Gama
 Campeonato Carioca (Rio de Janeiro State championship): 1987, 1988
 Campeonato Brasileiro (Brazilian championship): 1989
 Taça Guanabara: 1987, 1990

Palmeiras
 Campeonato Brasileiro (Brazilian championship): 1993, 1994
 Campeonato Paulista (São Paulo State championship): 1993, 1994
 Rio – São Paulo Tournament: 1993

International
Brazil
 FIFA World Cup: 1994
 Copa América: 1989

Individual
 Placar Bola de Prata: 1987, 1988, 1989;
 South American Player of the Year Silver Ball: 1989
 South American Team of the Year: 1989.

References

External links
 Mazinho at CBF.com.br 
 

1966 births
Living people
Brazilian footballers
Brazilian football managers
Naturalised citizens of Spain
Campeonato Brasileiro Série A players
Serie A players
La Liga players
Segunda División players
CR Vasco da Gama players
Sociedade Esportiva Palmeiras players
Santa Cruz Futebol Clube players
Esporte Clube Vitória players
U.S. Lecce players
ACF Fiorentina players
Valencia CF players
RC Celta de Vigo players
Elche CF players
Deportivo Alavés players
Brazilian expatriate footballers
1989 Copa América players
1990 FIFA World Cup players
1991 Copa América players
1994 FIFA World Cup players
Copa América-winning players
FIFA World Cup-winning players
Association football midfielders
Footballers at the 1988 Summer Olympics
Olympic footballers of Brazil
Olympic silver medalists for Brazil
Brazil international footballers
Expatriate footballers in Italy
Expatriate footballers in Spain
Aris Thessaloniki F.C. managers
Olympic medalists in football
Medalists at the 1988 Summer Olympics
Brazilian expatriate sportspeople in Spain
Brazilian expatriate sportspeople in Italy